This article describes all the 2012 seasons of Formula Renault series across the world.

Formula Renault 3.5L

Formula Renault 2.0L

2012 Formula Renault 2.0 Eurocup season

2012 Formula Renault 2.0 Northern European Cup season

2012 Formula Renault 2.0 Alps season

2012 Formula Renault BARC season

2012 Formula Renault 2.0 Italia season

Point system : 25, 18, 15, 12, 10, 8, 6, 4, 2, 1. In each race 1 point for Fastest lap and 1 for Pole position in race 1.
Races : 2 race by rounds length of 25 minutes each.

2012 Asian Formula Renault Challenge season
Point system : 30, 24, 20, 17, 15, 13, 11, 9, 7, 5, 4, 3, 2, 1 for 14th. No points for Fastest lap or Pole position. Drivers, that start their season at round 5 or later, don't receive any points for the final standing. The team point attribution is different from the driver point system : 10, 8, 6, 5, 4, 3, 2, 1.
Races : 2 races by rounds.
All races were held in China.

Formula Renault 1.6L

2012 French F4 Championship season

Other Formulas powered by Renault championships

2012 GP2 Series seasons

The GP2 Series is powered by 4 litre Renault V8 engines and Pirelli tyres with a Dallara chassis.

2012 GP3 Series seasons

2012 V de V Challenge Monoplace season

2012 Austria Formel Renault Cup season
The season will be probably held on 14 rounds in 7 venues in Czech Republic, Germany, France and Austria. The races occur with other categories: Austria Formula 3 Cup, Formelfrei and Formula 3,5L like (Renault 3,5L from World Series, Lola Cosworth). This section presents only the Austrian Formula Renault 2.0L classification.
Point system : 20, 15, 12, 10, 8, 6, 4, 3, 2, 1 for 10th. No points for Fastest lap or Pole position.

2012 Formula Renault 2.0 Argentina season
All cars use Tito 02 chassis, all races were held in Argentina.
 Point system : 20, 15, 12, 10, 8, 6, 4, 3, 2, 1 for 10th. 1 point for Pole position. 1 extra point in each race for regularly qualified drivers.

References

Renault
Formula Renault seasons